The fourth season of the Fox musical comedy-drama television series Glee was commissioned on April 9, 2012. It premiered on September 13, 2012, and is produced by 20th Century Fox Television, Ryan Murphy Television and Brad Falchuk Teley-Vision with executive producers Dante Di Loreto and series co-creators Ryan Murphy, Brad Falchuk and Ian Brennan.

The series features the New Directions glee club at the fictional William McKinley High School in the town of Lima, Ohio. The fourth season continues in Lima with a new generation of students but will also follow some of the McKinley graduates from the third season, notably to the fictional New York Academy of the Dramatic Arts (NYADA) in New York City. The season follows the club competing on the show choir circuit, while its members, faculty and alumni deal with sex, bulimia, gender identity, child molestation, dyslexia, school violence, pregnancy scares and other social issues. As of the season premiere, fourteen main cast members retained that status from the third season: glee club director Will Schuester (Matthew Morrison), cheerleading coach Sue Sylvester (Jane Lynch), glee club members Artie Abrams (Kevin McHale), Blaine Anderson (Darren Criss), Tina Cohen-Chang (Jenna Ushkowitz), and Brittany Pierce (Heather Morris), and graduates Rachel Berry (Lea Michele), Mike Chang (Harry Shum Jr.), Finn Hudson (Cory Monteith), Kurt Hummel (Chris Colfer), Mercedes Jones (Amber Riley), Santana Lopez (Naya Rivera) and Noah "Puck" Puckerman (Mark Salling). Previously recurring character Sam Evans (Chord Overstreet), a glee club member, was promoted to the main cast in the fourth season. 

Dianna Agron, who played Quinn Fabray, appeared less frequently in the season than in previous ones, as did some of the other graduates, including Mercedes Jones (Amber Riley), Mike Chang (Harry Shum Jr.), and Noah Puckerman (Mark Salling), despite still being credited as main cast members for this season. Agron and Jayma Mays, who continued to appear as guidance counselor Emma Pillsbury, were credited as guest stars this season rather than as series regulars.

This season marked the final appearance of Cory Monteith on the show before his death on July 13, 2013. The season was nominated for four Primetime Emmy Awards including one for Lynch's performance as Sue Sylvester and the Screen Actors Guild Award for Outstanding Performance by an Ensemble in a Comedy Series.

Episodes

Production

Development
The fourth season continued with McKinley High in Lima, Ohio as the primary setting, while also following several of the just-graduated characters to New York City and the fictional performing arts school (NYADA). The Ohio portion of the show featured a number of new characters.

Co-creator Ryan Murphy had confirmed that all regular cast members from the third season will be returning to the show for its fourth season, though "it doesn't mean everyone will be doing 22 episodes".

Fox announced on May 14, 2012, that Glee would be moving to Thursday nights at 9 pm ET for the fourth season. Episodes aired after that evening's 8 pm ET music competition "results" shows—The X Factor in the fall and American Idol in midseason. The season premiered on September 13, 2012 with the second episode of the season serving as the show's second Britney Spears tribute, featuring eight of her songs.

In the UK, Glee airs as part of Sky 1 Sundays at 8pm and broadcast began on January 6, 2013.

Some changes were made to the show's writing staff. Marti Noxon announced that she would no longer be a writer or consulting producer on the show, and co-executive producer and writer Ali Adler stated that she would be scaling back her work on Glee to focus on her new NBC comedy The New Normal, which she co-created with Murphy.

On July 14, 2012, Glee attended the San Diego Comic-Con in California. Co-creator Brad Falchuk revealed that Damian McGinty (Rory) would not be returning in the fall but stated he could return in the spring. Falchuk announced that Vanessa Lengies (Sugar) and Samuel Larsen (Joe) would be returning. Falchuk also had aspirations to bring back Alex Newell (Wade) at some point during Season 4. Other season details include the following: Sue had her baby when Season 4 commenced; episodes alternated between Ohio and New York, much like McKinley High and Dalton Academy in Season 2; and Kurt (Chris Colfer) remained in Ohio before moving to New York. Brad Falchuk also revealed that Will (Matthew Morrison) and Emma (Jayma Mays) would still be engaged when the season began, and he went on to state there would be many new faces during the season, also commenting that Rachel would have a roommate and new friends in New York. Season 4 featured a teaming up of Coach Roz (NeNe Leakes) and Sue (Jane Lynch) to take down Principal Figgins (Iqbal Theba).

On July 31, 2012, executive producer Murphy revealed on his Twitter account that the first group number of the season would be a cover of Adele's "Chasing Pavements". Murphy also tweeted that there would be an episode titled "The Break-Up" and a two-part Thanksgiving episode in which the Sectionals competition will take place. Murphy also stated that the show would be doing another Christmas episode this season.

Executive producer Falchuk stated that Season 4 will not revolve around relationships as much as past seasons, commenting, "Relationships in general will be less of a focus this year, I personally think a lot of these characters are more interesting not in relationships. And I think with a lot of them we will be exploring that. Whether they break up or not, we’re really focused on giving them more individual stories."

Filming
Season four of Glee began filming on Tuesday, July 24, 2012. A substantial amount of exterior shots depicting New York City were shot on location in that city. Studio recording for the season began earlier, by July 19, 2012, with Jenna Ushkowitz and Heather Morris recording on that day.

Cast
Fox credits fourteen main cast members for the season: Matthew Morrison as Glee Club director Will Schuester; Jane Lynch as cheerleading coach Sue Sylvester; Chris Colfer, Lea Michele, Cory Monteith, Amber Riley, Naya Rivera, Mark Salling and Harry Shum Jr. as McKinley graduates and former glee club members Kurt Hummel, Rachel Berry, Finn Hudson, Mercedes Jones, Santana Lopez, Noah "Puck" Puckerman and Mike Chang respectively; and Darren Criss, Kevin McHale, Heather Morris, Chord Overstreet and Jenna Ushkowitz as current glee club members Blaine Anderson, Artie Abrams, Brittany Pierce, Sam Evans, and Tina Cohen-Chang respectively. Overstreet received a contractual upgrade, having formerly been a recurring cast member. Two previous main cast members who are no longer series regulars are Jayma Mays as guidance counselor Emma Pillsbury, and Dianna Agron as Quinn Fabray, though both are listed among the guest cast for this season.

Two actresses appeared in multi-episode guest-starring arcs as part of the New York sequences: Sarah Jessica Parker as Isabelle Wright (first reported as Isabelle Klempt), and Kate Hudson as Cassandra July. Parker's character is a mentor to Kurt, and Hudson's character is Rachel's dance teacher at NYADA; Hudson was originally reported to be appearing in six episodes during the fall.

Several new recurring characters were added for the new season. Dean Geyer as Brody Weston, a handsome junior at Rachel's new school, Jacob Artist as McKinley sophomore Jake Puckerman, Puck's (Mark Salling) younger half brother, Becca Tobin as Kitty, a cheerleader, and Melissa Benoist as Marley Rose. Marley's mother Millie was played by Trisha Rae Stahl.

The Glee Project winner Blake Jenner was awarded a recurring role, initially set for at least seven episodes, starting with the fifth episode; he plays Ryder Lynn, a new McKinley student, who joins New Directions with Finn's aid. Jenner has commented that he would enjoy playing a character like Finn. Glee Project runner-up Ali Stroker had a guest role on "I Do" as Betty, Emma's niece and Artie's love interest.

Actress Whoopi Goldberg reprised her Season 3 role, Carmen Tibideaux, Dean of Vocal Performance and Song Interpretation at NYADA. She recurred throughout the season. Other recurring guests who returned include Vanessa Lengies as Sugar Motta, Samuel Larsen as Joe Hart and Alex Newell as Wade "Unique" Adams. Lauren Potter as cheerleader Becky Jackson also returned, and filmed scenes on August 22, 2012. Damian McGinty (Rory Flanagan) was not a part of the regular cast, but he made a special appearance in "Glee, Actually" as Artie's guardian angel in a dream sequence. From the cast of recurring adult characters, Dot-Marie Jones as Coach Beiste, Iqbal Theba as Principal Figgins and NeNe Leakes as Coach Roz Washington all returned. Jessalyn Gilsig, like McGinty, made a special appearance in "Glee, Actually" in Artie's dream sequence, reprising her role as Terri Schuester. Grant Gustin returned as Dalton Academy Warbler Sebastian Smythe, and the group's new leader, Hunter, was played by Nolan Gerard Funk. Ashley Fink also returned for a guest appearance in "Sadie Hawkins" reprising her role as Lauren Zizes after being absent for most of Season 3 and the first ten episodes of Season 4. American Idol season 11 runner-up Jessica Sanchez appeared near the end of the season as a student from a rival school named Frida Romero, who has been described as a "powerhouse singer".
Idina Menzel also reprised her role as Shelby Corcoran for a guest appearance in "Sweet Dreams" for the first time since her multi-episode arc in Season 3.

Reception

Critical response
The review aggregator website Rotten Tomatoes gives the season a 65% with an average rating of 7.07/10, based on 23 reviews. The site's critics consensus reads, "Glee may have lost a few of its major characters, but several strong storylines help to compensate, and the songs are as strong as ever."

On Metacritic it received a score of 73 out of 100 based on 6 reviews, indicating "generally favorable reviews".

Ratings
As of April 19, 2013, after 19 of 22 episodes in the season, the season had averaged a 3.6/10 rating/share among adults 18-49 and 8.70 million viewers when counting live plus 7 Day (DVR) Ratings.

Live + SD Ratings

Home video releases
Glee: The Complete Fourth Season was released on October 1, 2013, in DVD (with 6-set discs) and Blu-ray (with 4-set discs), and contains the special features; "Glee Music Jukebox", "Movin' On Up: Glee in NYC", "Deleted Scenes", "Jarley", "Building New York", "Glee on Film", "The Road to 500", "Blaine's Time Capsule" and "Glee Premiere Party!". After Cory Monteith's death on July 13, 2013, they decided to re-design the Season 4 DVD cover art to include an image of Finn. However, this change has altered the release date.

References

2012 American television seasons
2013 American television seasons
 4